DZWN (1125 AM) Bombo Radyo is a radio station owned and operated by Bombo Radyo Philippines through its licensee People's Broadcasting Service. Its studio and transmitter are located at Bombo Radyo Broadcast Center, Maramba Bankers Village, Brgy. Bonuan Catacdang, Dagupan.

References

Radio stations in Dagupan
Radio stations established in 1980
News and talk radio stations in the Philippines